A defensive tackle (DT) is a position in American football that will typically line up on the line of scrimmage, opposite one of the offensive guards; however, he may also line up opposite one of the tackles. Defensive tackles are typically the largest and strongest of the defensive players. Depending on a team's individual defensive scheme, a defensive tackle may be called upon to fill several different roles.  These roles may include merely holding the point of attack by refusing to be moved, or penetrating a certain gap between offensive linemen to break up a play in the opponent's backfield. If a defensive tackle reads a pass play, his primary responsibility is to pursue the quarterback, or simply knock the pass down at the line if it is within arm's reach.  Other responsibilities of the defensive tackle may be to pursue the screen pass or drop into coverage in a zone blitz scheme. In a traditional 4–3 defense, there is no nose tackle. Instead there is a left and right defensive tackle. Some teams, especially in the National Football League (NFL), have a nose tackle in this scheme, but most of them do not.

Nose tackle

Nose tackle (also nose guard  or middle guard) is a defensive alignment position for a defensive lineman. In the 3–4 defensive scheme the sole defensive tackle is referred to as the nose tackle. The nose tackle aligns across the line of scrimmage from the offense's center before the play begins in the "0-technique" position.  In this position, frequently taking on the center and at least one if not both of the guards, the nose tackle is considered to be the most physically demanding position in gridiron football. In five-linemen situations, such as a goal-line formation, the nose guard is the innermost lineman, flanked on either side by a defensive tackle or defensive end. According to Pat Kirwan, a traditional 3–4 defense demands "a massive man who can clog up the middle," while a 4–3 defense is looking for "a nose tackle who relies on quickness to penetrate and move along the front."

Typical 3–4 nose tackles are "big wide bodies who can hold the point of attack and force double teams by the guard and center." Recent examples of such nose tackles include Gilbert Brown, Casey Hampton, Jamal Williams, Vince Wilfork, and Damon Harrison.

In some 4–3 defenses, the nose tackle is one of two defensive tackles. Some teams, especially in the NFL, have a nose tackle in the 4–3 defense, which lines up against the opposing center and very likely the weak-side or pulling guard. In a 4–3 defense, nose tackles are rather quick and supposed to "shoot the 'A gap' and beat the center and very likely the weak-side or pulling guard into the backfield."

The terms "nose guard" or "middle guard" were more commonly used with the five-man defensive line of the older 5–2 defense.  Effective against most plays of the day, but with a weakness to the inside short pass, the 5–2 was phased out of the pro game in the late 1950s.  In the 4–3 defense, the upright middle linebacker replaced the middle guard. The nose guard is also used in a 50 read defense.  In this defense there is a nose guard, two defensive tackles, and two outside linebackers who can play on the line of scrimmage or off the line of scrimmage in a two-point stance.  The nose guard lines up head up on the center about six to eighteen inches off the ball. In a reading 50 defense, the nose guard's key is to read the offensive center to the ball.  In run away, the nose guard's job is to shed the blocker and pursue down the line of scrimmage, taking an angle of pursuit. The primary responsibility of the nose tackle in this scheme is to absorb multiple blockers so that other players in the defensive front can attack ball carriers and rush the quarterback.

3-technique tackle
A 3-technique tackle (also 3-tech) or undertackle is often featured in a formation with four defensive linemen (such as the traditional 4–3 or the 4–2–5 Nickel defense), but can sometimes fill in as the nose tackle in a 3–4 defense. Compared to the 0 or 1-tech who is more prototypical of the nose tackle, the 3-tech is often a smaller, more agile defensive lineman (but still larger than the defensive ends) who specializes in penetrating through the line with his quickness as his bigger counterpart occupies blockers, aiming to sack the quarterback or tackle the rusher (often the running back) for a loss of yards. The 3-tech often lines up against the "weak side" of the offensive line, and therefore faces fewer double-teams as a result. Notable examples of prototypical 3-tech tackles in the NFL include Geno Atkins, Sharrif Floyd, Tyrone Crawford, Kyle Williams, Ndamukong Suh, Aaron Donald, and Ed Oliver. Donald and Oliver, in particular, have pushed the limits on how small the 3-tech can be, both weighing just 285 lbs. Their smaller statures have drawn criticism, but Donald and Oliver often make up for this using their athleticism. Donald has made eight Pro Bowls and was thrice named the AP Defensive Player of the Year.

References

American football positions